Thiago Augusto Fernandes (born 20 May 1990) is a professional footballer who plays as a striker. Born in Brazil, Augusto represents the Bahrain national football team internationally.

Club career
Thiago Augusto started playing football in Grêmio de Esportes Maringá, then to Maringá Futebol Clube and Operário Ferroviário Esporte Clube, all in his home country, Brazil.

Manama Club
He was then transferred to Manama Club in Bahrain.

Felda United
In April 2015, Thiago Augusto was transferred to Felda United in Malaysia. He plays under the squad number 49. He has played 10 matches and scored 13 goals. Thiago was the topscorer for the club during 2015 season. He have a sharp finishing, great individual skill and great header. Coupling with Zah Rahan Krangar often intimidating opponent.

Just before the 2016 season kicked off, Thiago suffered a lengthy injury that sidelined him from then Felda United head coach Irfan Bakti Abu Salim's squad, although the club still kept Thiago under contract. But when the mid-season transfer window opened, Irfan decided against listing him in the competitions squad to avoid disrupting the already-established team dynamics, and loaned him out to Kedah. Despite helping Kedah lift the Malaysia Cup title at the end of the season, Thiago was not retained by either Kedah or Felda, and briefly rejoined his other former club Manama.

Kedah
In July 2016, he was loaned out to Kedah from Felda United. His arrival saw another Kedah player, Ahmad Fakri Saarani moved to Felda United for the remaining campaign of the Malaysia Super League 2016 season, in an exchange deal between the two football teams. This move saw Thiago teamed up with his compatriot, Sandro da Silva Mendonça.

He made his debut also marked with his debut goal on 13 July 2016 against Sarawak in Malaysian Cup, the winning goal in a 4–3 result.

Felda United
In June 2017, Thiago return to Malaysian football as he re-signed to Felda United for a second stint as replacement for the underperforming Argentine Gastón Cellerino, having played for them from 2015 to 2016.

Manama Club
He rejoined his former Bahraini club Manama at 2019 after Felda United not extend his contract in 2018.

Al Muharraq
He transferred to Al-Muharraq in July 2019.

International career
Thiago Augusto had represented Brazil U20 team, but was not included in the final squad of the 2009 South American U-20 Championship, where Brazil emerged champions and qualified for the 2009 FIFA U-20 World Cup, He was also not included for the latter tournament.

Bahrain national team
On 23 November 2019, Helio Sousa, Bahrain's national team manager, announced that Augusto will join the national team for the 24th Arabian Gulf Cup. He was subsequently naturalized granting him Bahraini citizenship. His debut for Bahrain was in the tournament playing against Oman making him the first Brazilian player to represent Bahrain in the national team. He scored his first two international goals against Kuwait in a 4–2 win, advancing Bahrain to the semi-finals of the tournament. Bahrain eventually won the Gulf Cup for the first time after a 1–0 win over Saudi Arabia in the final.

Career statistics

Club

International

International goals
Scores and results list Bahrain's goal tally first.

Honours

Club

Kedah FA
Malaysia Cup 
 Winners (1): 2016

Felda United
Malaysia Super League 
 Third place (1): 2017 
Malaysia Premier League
 Winners (1): 2018

Country

Bahrain
Arabian Gulf Cup
 Winners (1): 2019

References

External links
 

1990 births
Living people
People from Joinville
Bahraini footballers
Bahrain international footballers
Brazilian footballers
Brazil youth international footballers
Brazilian emigrants to Bahrain
Association football forwards
Felda United F.C. players
Kedah Darul Aman F.C. players
Operário Ferroviário Esporte Clube players
Naturalized citizens of Bahrain
Brazilian expatriate footballers
Expatriate footballers in Malaysia
Expatriate footballers in the United Arab Emirates
Brazilian expatriate sportspeople in Malaysia
Brazilian expatriate sportspeople in the United Arab Emirates
Al-Muharraq SC players
Bahraini Premier League players
Al Bataeh Club players
UAE First Division League players
Sportspeople from Santa Catarina (state)